Erling L'Orsa Tveit  (born 28 December 1984) is a former tennis player from Norway.

Tennis career
Tveit played collegiate tennis for the University of Mississippi before turning professional, earning All-American honours for singles and doubles in both 2006 and 2007.

Tveit made his debut for the Norway Davis Cup team in 2003 against Luxembourg. He had a 10-year Davis Cup career and won 9 of the 18 singles matches and 7 of the 14 doubles matches that he played. His one ATP tour main draw appearance was at the 2007 Swedish Open, when he lost in the first round to Fernando Verdasco.

Tveit mainly participated on the ATP Challenger Tour and the Futures circuit. He had a career best singles ranking of 484 on the professional tour and a best doubles ranking of 713, winning three ITF Futures doubles tournaments.

ITF Futures titles

Doubles: (3)

See also
Norwegian Davis Cup players

References

External links

 
1984 births
Living people
Norwegian male tennis players
Ole Miss Rebels men's tennis players
Sportspeople from Oslo
21st-century Norwegian people